Esmaili-ye Sofla (also Romanized as Esmā‘īlī-ye Soflá; also known as Jūb-e Shahr Esma‘īl) is a village in Nabovat Rural District, in the Central District of Eyvan County, Ilam Province, Iran. At the 2006 census, its population was 136, in 25 families. The village is populated by Kurds.

References 

Populated places in Eyvan County
Kurdish settlements in Ilam Province